= Christian Glasgow =

Christian Glasgow (b St Vincent) is an Anglican priest: he has been Archdeacon of Grenada since 2011.
